Sundar V. Nadkarni (1938–1994) was a Kannada poet, writer and professor, who was awarded Karnataka Sahitya Akademi for the fiction 'Mandi Mane'. He was a younger brother of Mangesh V. Nadkarni.

Sundar V. Nadkarni was born and raised in Bankikkodla, a village in coastal India. Sundar earned his high school diploma (1955) from the A. H. School a school from his village. Nadkarni was a Professor of English in Arts and Science College, Anand, Gujarat. Later in the year 1985, he earned a Ph.D in English from the Department of English, Sardar Patel University. "[Citaded]"

Selected books

 Manthan
 Hasiru Deep
 Usirugal Beediyali
 Antard Neeru
 Negasu
 Mohitaru
 Godegalu
 Avar Naduve
 Suddi
 Mandi Mane (Karnataka state Sahitya Akademi award)

References 

Kannada poets
Kannada-language writers
Educators from Karnataka
Kannada people
1938 births
1994 deaths
People from Karwar
20th-century Indian poets
Poets from Karnataka
20th-century Indian educators